Wyoming Highway 450 (WYO 450) is a  east-west Wyoming State Road in Campbell and Weston counties that provides travel between WYO 59 at Wright and U.S. Route 16 (US 16) at Newcastle.

Route description
Wyoming Highway 450 begins its western end in the Town of Wright in Campbell County at Wyoming Highway 59, just south of the eastern terminus of Wyoming Highway 387. Highway 450 heads due east through Thunder Basin National Grassland for much of its length. Nearing 21 miles, WYO 450 leaves Campbell County and enters Weston. Nearing its eastern end WYO 450 reaches the City of Newcastle, the county seat of Weston County, where it ends at US Route 16.

Major intersections

See also

 List of state highways in Wyoming
 List of highways numbered 450

References

External links 

 Wyoming State Routes 400-499
 Thunder Basin National Grassland federal website
 Wright, WY website
 Newcastle, WY website

Transportation in Campbell County, Wyoming
Transportation in Weston County, Wyoming
450